Intrinsic value may refer to:

Economics, finance, numismatics
Intrinsic value (finance), of an option or stock
Intrinsic theory of value, an economic theory of worth

Ethics and philosophy
Intrinsic value (ethics), in ethics and philosophy
Intrinsic value (animal ethics), in philosophy

See also
 Extrinsic value
 Value (disambiguation)